Stawellia is a genus of herbs in the family Asphodelaceae, subfamily Hemerocallidoideae, first described as a genus in 1870. The entire genus is endemic to the State of Western Australia.

2 species comprise the Stawellia genus:
Stawellia dimorphantha F.Muell., Fragm. 7: 85 (1870)
Stawellia gymnocephala Diels, Bot. Jahrb. Syst. 35: 100 (1904)

References

Asphodelaceae genera
Hemerocallidoideae
Endemic flora of Australia